James McCallum (born 27 April 1979 in Uddingston/Bellshill, Glasgow) is a Scottish former racing cyclist who last rode for the NFTO Pro Cycling squad. He represented Scotland in the Team Pursuit, Points & Scratch Races at the 2002 Commonwealth Games in Manchester, and again in 2006 in Melbourne in the Scratch, Points & Road Races, winning a bronze medal in the Scratch race.

Until 2007, between racing and training, McCallum worked night shifts as a nurse. He is currently the Scottish Cycling Coordinator, combining the job with his racing and training, working to promote cycling in Scotland. McCallum's grandfather was a cyclist before him, but McCallum dabbled in many sports before settling on cycling. At one point he was a gymnast.

He recently joined the Champions in Schools project that helps to inspire Scotland's youth to follow a pathway to good health and sport.
McCallum now runs his own coaching consultancy - Mach 10 training systems. Among the riders he has coached is British National Circuit Race Champion Eileen Roe.

McCallum left  at the end of the 2013 season, and joined the NFTO Pro Cycling squad for 2014.

McCallum announced that he would be retiring from the sport after competing at the 2014 Commonwealth Games in Glasgow. After retiring from racing he became directeur sportif and general manager of the Neon Velo cycling team in 2015. In August 2015 he announced that he was joining  as a coach and directeur sportif with immediate effect.

In 2016, McCallum broke Mark Beaumont's record for riding the north coast 500, a 516-mile tourist route circumnavigating the top of Scotland, completing the distance in under 31 hours, with 28 hours 57 minutes spent in the saddle. The ride raised funds for Thrombosis UK in memory of his sister-in-law, Charlene Doolan.

Palmarès

2001
1st  Scottish National Track Championships, Kilo
3rd British National Track Championships, Team Pursuit (with Richard Chapman, David Lowe & Ross Muir)

2004
2nd  Omnium, British National Track Championships

2006
3rd  Scratch Race (20km), Commonwealth Games

2007
1st  British National Circuit Race Championships
1st Smithfield Nocturne
2nd British National Derny Championships
3rd Scottish National Circuit Race Championships

2009
1st British National Omnium Championships

2011
2nd Smithfield Nocturne

2012
1st Scottish National Road Race Championships
2nd Wales Open Criterium
3rd Rutland–Melton International CiCLE Classic

2013
3rd Scottish National Road Race Championships

2014
2nd Scottish National Road Race Championship
3rd London Nocturne
4th Rutland–Melton International CiCLE Classic

See also
City of Edinburgh Racing Club
Achievements of members of City of Edinburgh Racing Club

References

External links
Interview with James McCallum (Film)
Results on British Cycling website

Scottish male cyclists
Cyclists at the 2002 Commonwealth Games
Cyclists at the 2006 Commonwealth Games
Commonwealth Games bronze medallists for Scotland
1979 births
Living people
Cyclists at the 2010 Commonwealth Games
Cyclists from Glasgow
Commonwealth Games medallists in cycling
Medallists at the 2006 Commonwealth Games